Steven Thomas is an Australian sailor.

Together with teammate Jasper Warren Thomas became the 2008 World Champion in the 29er boat by finishing in front of fellow Australians Byron White and William Ryan.

Career highlights

World Championships
2008 - Sorrento,  1st, 29er (with Jasper Warren)

External links 
 
 
 

Living people
Australian male sailors (sport)
29er class world champions
World champions in sailing for Australia
Year of birth missing (living people)